The Ontario Libertarian Party (OLP) is a minor libertarian party in the Canadian province of Ontario. Founded in 1975 by Bruce Evoy and Vince Miller, the party was inspired by the 1972 formation of the United States Libertarian Party. The party is guided by a charter of principles, and its own Ontario charter of rights and freedoms.

In the 2018 Ontario general election, the Libertarian Party, under the leadership of Allen Small, was one of only five such organizations running a candidate in a majority of the province's electoral districts. Jacques Boudreau was appointed interim party leader in March 2021, replacing elected leader Keith Komar after he stepped down. In October 2021, Mark Snow was elected leader at the Party's convention. Under Snow, the party promotes an Ontario charter of rights which includes a section on immigration restrictions based on the eligibility of obtaining a job at an English speaking workplace. The party fielded only 16 candidates in the 2022 Ontario general election, over 100 fewer candidates than the province's previous election held in 2018.

Election results

In 1995, under the leadership of John Shadbolt, the party's total vote declined to 6,085 votes. Shadbolt resigned one day after the 1995 election, and was replaced by George Dance on an interim basis. Sam Apelbaum was chosen as the party's full-time leader at a convention in October 1996.

Changes to the Ontario Election Act, enabling fixed election dates at four-year intervals, allowed the party to prepare well in advance for the 2007 general election. As a result, the party fielded 25 candidates and obtained a total of 9,249 votes.

In the 2011 general election, the party ran 51 candidates and won a total of 19,387 votes, 0.45% of the popular vote.  This was more than double the number of candidates and votes received in the 2007 general election.

The party's most successful election was in the 2014 general election, with Libertarian candidates receiving 0.81% of the vote.

The party failed to win any seats in the 2022 Ontario general election.

Party leaders

 Terry Coughlin (elected at founding meeting, July 24, 1975)
 Paul Mollon (1977 election)
 Scott Bell (1981 and 1985 elections)
 Kaye Sargent (1987 election)
 Clarke Slemon (elected October 22, 1988)<The Sunday Sun newspaper October 23, 1988 pg. 74 "New leader waxes poetic"></ref>
 James Stock (1990 election)
 John Shadbolt (? – June 9, 1995)
 George Dance (interim) (June 9, 1995 – October 1996)
 Sam Apelbaum (October 1996 – November 5, 2011)
 Allen Small (November 5, 2011 – July 20, 2018)
 Rob Ferguson (interim) (July 21, 2018 – November 2, 2019)      
 Keith Komar   (November 2, 2019 – March 7, 2021)
 Jacques Boudreau (interim) (March 7, 2021 – October 24, 2021)
 Mark Snow (October 24, 2021 – Present)

See also

 Libertarian Party candidates, 2003 Ontario provincial election
 List of Ontario general elections
 List of political parties in Canada

References

External links
 

1975 establishments in Ontario
Libertarianism in Canada
Libertarian parties
Political parties established in 1975
Provincial political parties in Ontario